Zdenka Fantlová (28 March 1922 – 14 November 2022) was a Czech actor, writer and Holocaust survivor.

Biography
Fantlová was born in Blatná on 28 March 1922, and grew up in Rokycany in Czechoslovakia. She and her family, like large parts of the Jewish population in Czechoslovakia, were deported in January 1942 to the ghetto in Theresienstadt, where her boyfriend Arno had also previously been taken. Faced with the prospect of being abducted from Theresienstadt, Arno made a pewter ring with the inscription "Arno 13.6.1942" which he gave to Zdenka as an engagement gift. The next day, Arno was abducted and never seen again. Under difficult circumstances, Zdenka kept the pewter ring as a memento of her youthful love, and it later became part of the title of her autobiography.

Fantlová participated in the theatre activities that occurred in Theresienstadt. The ghetto was closed in autumn 1944 and its inhabitants were moved on to other camps. On 17 October 1944, Fantlová and her mother and sister were deported in cattle cars to Auschwitz, where the mother was murdered shortly after arrival. She and her sister Lydia then passed through the camps Gross-Rosen in Germany, Mauthausen in Austria and finally Bergen-Belsen, where her sister Lydia died in the typhus epidemic that raged there. Fantlová survived and was liberated by the British Army on 15 April 1945. Fantlová stayed for a time in Sweden, where she received care and recovery under the auspices of the Red Cross.

Fantlová emigrated in 1949 to Australia where she worked as an actor, and in 1969 moved to London. For many years, she came to visit schools and other organisations and tell about her experiences of Nazi abuse during the Second World War.

Fantlová died on 14 November 2022, at the age of 100.

Bibliography
Klid je síla, řek̕ tatínek. Primus. 1996. . OCLC 36752461
My lucky star. New York: Herodias. 2001. Libris 6938579. 
Fantlová, Zdenka; Viney, Deryck (2012). The Tin Ring: how I cheated death. Alnwick, Northumberland: McNidder & Grace. Libris 16015278. 
Haggith, Toby; Newman, Joanna, eds. (2005). Holocaust and the moving image: representations in film and television since 1933. Includes a contribution by Zdenka Fantlová. London: Wallflower Press. Libris 9805801.

References

1922 births
2022 deaths
20th-century Czech actors
21st-century women writers
Holocaust survivors
Jewish women writers
People from Strakonice District
Theresienstadt Ghetto survivors
20th-century Jews
Gross-Rosen concentration camp survivors
Mauthausen concentration camp survivors
Bergen-Belsen concentration camp survivors
Women in World War II
21st-century Jews
Czech centenarians
Women centenarians
Auschwitz concentration camp survivors